The Saint Augustine Church (Spanish: Iglesia de San Agustín de Paoay), commonly known as the Paoay Church, is a Roman Catholic church in the Municipality of Paoay, Ilocos Norte in the Philippines. Completed in 1710, the church is famous for its distinct architecture highlighted by the enormous buttresses on the sides and back of the building. It is declared as a National Cultural Treasure by the Philippine government in 1973 and a UNESCO World Heritage Site under the collective group of Baroque Churches of the Philippines in 1993.

History
The earliest historical record of the area dates back to 1593, becoming an independent Augustinian parish in 1686. Building of the present church was started in 1694 by Augustinian friar Father Antonio Estavillo, completed in 1710 and rededicated in 1896. Some portions of the church was damaged in the 1865 and 1885 earthquakes but was later restored under the initiative of former First Lady Imelda Marcos.

Restorations 
Several projects for the restoration of Paoay Church were sought by government and non-government organizations due to possible question on its structural integrity. The local government of Ilocos Norte through resolution is seeking the reconstruction of the church's convent presently in ruins and retrofitting of the church.

Restoration of the church's buttresses, walls, tower, and interior was announced in 2018. Conservation of the church's exteriors was begun by the National Historical Commission of the Philippines in the second quarter of 2019 and completed in June 2020. Work focused on the historic stone masonry walls and buttresses. Vegetation was removed from the exteriors to prevent stone erosion and lime grout loss. Major structural repair was done on the stairway of the bell tower. The entire roof system was also rehabilitated.

The restored structure was turned over to the Laoag diocese in November 2020, and was reopened on November 15 of that year.

Architecture
Paoay church is the Philippines' primary example of a Spanish colonial earthquake baroque architecture dubbed by Alicia Coseteng, an interpretation of the European Baroque adapted to the seismic condition of the country through the use of enormous buttresses on the sides and back of the building. The adaptive reuse of baroque style against earthquake is developed since many destructive earthquakes destroyed earlier churches in the country. Javanese architecture reminiscent of Borobudur of Java can also be seen on the church walls and façade.

Buttresses 
Extending from the exterior walls, it was conceived to a solution to possible destruction of the building due to earthquakes. Its stair-like buttresses (known as step buttresses) at the sides of the church is possibly for easy access of the roof.

Walls 
Its walls are made of large coral stones on the lower part and bricks at the upper levels. The mortar used in the church includes sand and lime with sugarcane juice boiled with mango leaves, leather and rice straw. Its walls suggests Javanese architectural styles.

Façade 
The stone façade appear as massive pediment rising from the ground and is built leaning towards the front. Square pilasters and stringed cornices divide the facade vertically and horizontally respectively. Its bottom part is plain. Gothic features are also present through the use of finials while the triangular pediment shows Chinese elements and Oriental strokes. Crenellations, niches, rosettes and the Augustinian coat of arms can also be seen. The façade is made of brick on the lower level and coral stones on the upper level.

Bell tower 
Adjacent to the façade is a three-storey coral bell tower constructed separately from the church building on the right side resembling a pagoda. It was in 1793 when the cornerstone of the bell tower was laid. It stands at some distance from the church as a protection against earthquake. It served as observational post for Filipino revolutionaries against the Spaniards in 1898 and by Filipino guerrillas against Japanese soldiers during World War II. According to historians, the bell tower also served as a status symbol for the locals. It is said that the bell would ring more loudly and more times during the wedding of a prominent clan that it would during the wedding of the poor.

Gallery

Declarations 

By virtue of Presidential Decree No. 260, Paoay Church was declared as a National Cultural Treasure by the Philippine government in 1973. The church was designated as a UNESCO World Heritage Site together with San Agustin Church in Manila; Nuestra Señora de la Asuncion Church in Santa Maria, Ilocos Sur; and Sto. Tomas de Villanueva Parish Church in Miagao, Iloilo on December 11, 1993.

In popular culture 
The church was featured in a scene in the 1993 romance film Saan Ka Man Naroroon, which was shot in Ilocos Norte and Ilocos Sur.

See also
Architecture of the Philippines
Spanish Baroque architecture

References

External links

Roman Catholic churches in Ilocos Norte
Baroque church buildings in the Philippines
Roman Catholic churches completed in 1710
World Heritage Sites in the Philippines
1710 establishments in the Spanish Empire
18th-century Roman Catholic church buildings in the Philippines
Churches in the Roman Catholic Diocese of Laoag